Career Grand Slam may refer to:

 Tennis Career Grand Slam
 Golf Career Grand Slam